Gerov Pass (‘Gerov Prohod’ \'ge-rov 'pro-hod\) is a pass of elevation 400 m in Friesland Ridge, Tangra Mountains on Livingston Island in the South Shetland Islands, Antarctica.  Situated on Rozhen Peninsula, 1.6 km south-southeast of Pleven Saddle.  Bounded by Shumen Peak to the east-northeast, and Gabrovo Knoll to the west-southwest.  Providing overland access between Charity Glacier to the northwest and Tarnovo Ice Piedmont to the south.  Bulgarian topographic survey Tangra 2004/05.  Named
after the Bulgarian linguist Nayden Gerov (1823–1900).

Location
British mapping in 1968, Spanish in 1991 and Bulgarian in 2005 and 2009.

Map
 L.L. Ivanov. Antarctica: Livingston Island and Greenwich, Robert, Snow and Smith Islands. Scale 1:120000 topographic map.  Troyan: Manfred Wörner Foundation, 2009.

References
 Gerov Pass. SCAR Composite Gazetteer of Antarctica.
 Bulgarian Antarctic Gazetteer. Antarctic Place-names Commission. (details in Bulgarian, basic data in English)

External links
 Gerov Pass. Copernix satellite image

Mountain passes of Livingston Island
Bulgaria and the Antarctic